These are instances of subliminal messages that have led to controversy and occasionally legal allegations.

In 1978, Wichita, Kansas television station KAKE-TV received special permission from the police to place a subliminal message in a report on the BTK Killer (Bind, Torture, Kill) in an effort to get him to turn himself in. The subliminal message included the text "Now call the chief", as well as a pair of glasses. The glasses were included because when BTK murdered Nancy Fox, there was a pair of glasses lying upside down on her dresser; police felt that seeing the glasses might stir up remorse in the killer. The attempt was unsuccessful, and police reported no increased volume of calls afterward.
During the 2000 U.S. presidential campaign, a television ad advertising for Republican candidate George W. Bush showed words (and parts thereof) scaling from the foreground to the background on a television screen. When the word  flashed on the screen, one frame showed only the last part, . The Federal Communications Commission looked into the matter, but no penalties were ever assessed in the case.
In the British alternative comedy show The Young Ones, a number of subliminal images were present in the original and most repeated broadcasts of the second series. Images included a tern coming into land, a tree frog jumping through the air, a man gurning, and the end credits of the film Carry On Cowboy.  These were included to mock the then-occurring matter of subliminal messages in television. These images appear in the U.S. box set DVD Every Stoopid Episode.
Shaun Micallef's Australian The Micallef P(r)ogram(me) shows contained strange subliminal messages that can be seen on the DVDs. As they are of random, humorous statements, questions, etc., they are not regarded as advertising. They were usually images of politicians, as is the case with his more recent Newstopia.
In the Warner Bros. 1943 animated film The Wise Quacking Duck, Daffy Duck spins a statue which is holding a shield. For one frame, the words "BUY BONDS" are visible on the shield.
The horror film The Exorcist is well known for its frightening yet effective use of subliminal images throughout the film, depicting a white-faced demon named Captain Howdy. This image is shown in the character Father Karras' nightmare, where it flashes across the screen for a few seconds before fading away.
A McDonald's logo appeared for one frame during the Food Network's Iron Chef America series on 2007-01-27, leading to claims that this was an instance of subliminal advertising. The Food Network replied that it was simply a glitch.
In Formula One racing, the paint scheme of many cars would carry messages intended to look as if they were of banned tobacco products in many Grands Prix where tobacco advertising was banned, though many of these were jokes on the part of the teams (for example, Jordan Grand Prix ran Benson and Hedges sponsorship as "Bitten and Hisses" with a snake-skin design on their cars). A similar procedure was used by NASCAR driver Jeff Burton after the AT&T Mobility advertising was banned by a court order in 2007, and by Penske Championship Racing in NASCAR (where Cellco Partnership is prohibited) and the IRL (Marlboro). In both instances, a distinctive design where the banned company's identity (the Verizon "V" and the Marlboro chevron) were integrated into the car's design.
On November 7, 2007, Network 10 Australia's broadcast of the ARIA Awards was called out for using subliminal advertising in an exposé by the Media Watch program on the ABC (Australian Broadcasting Corporation).
In June–July 2007, Sprite used a type of obvious subliminal message, involving yellow (lemon) and green (lime) objects such as cars. The objects would then be shown inconspicuously in the same setting, while showing the word "lymon" (combining the words lime and lemon) on screen for a second at a time. They called this "Sublymonal Advertising." The previous year, Sprite used a similar advertising campaign, but this time it was tied into Lost Experience, an alternate reality game.
In Sunshine (2007), five pictures of the crew are shown subliminally during part of the film.
In Brainiac: Science Abuse, there is an experiment carried out to see if viewers would react to subliminal messages. One was shown during an experiment to discover which substance provides the best skid; the message appeared when a brainiac hit a bale of hay. The second message appeared across a T-shirt of a brainiac saying 'Call your mum', and the third said 'scratch your nose' when a sound wave hit the Brainiac logo. At the end of the show, people were shown in a theatre watching that episode. The test showed that the messages barely impacted the audience. The subliminal content in this episode was legal, as its presence was announced at the beginning and end of the episode.
In Week 11 of The Apprentice: Martha Stewart in which candidates have to create an ad for the Delta's former low-cost commercial airlines Song, the team Matchstick used a 1/48-frame image in the bottom-right corner with the Song Airlines logo.
In the film Cloverfield, three subliminal pictures can be seen during various parts of the film, when the camera footage distorts. The photos are actually frames from classic monster films. The images are shown one at a time: the first, from Them!, appears when the group plays the footage back, the second, from The Beast from 20,000 Fathoms, appears when they close the door on the 'parasites' and the third, from King Kong appears when the helicopter crashes. A monstrous creature can also be seen in the top right corner (with its mouth slightly open) as one of the clouds over the Statue of Liberty on the release cover.
In an episode of British TV show QI based on hypnosis, host Stephen Fry suggested that he could use subliminal messages to get himself elected as the Pope. The words "Stephen Fry for Pope" then briefly flashed up on the screen. This was repeated later on in the episode.
In the episode "Men Without Women" of The IT Crowd, there is a scene where the character Douglas is trying to seduce Jen by showing her a film about his company on his laptop, which featured a subliminal message of Douglas lying in bed. Jen saw the image, but suspected the image meant something was wrong with his laptop. During the credits of the episode, the same image flashes briefly as a subliminal message.
In the Bull television series episode "Bad Medicine" on CBS (2018-03-27), an advertisement for Cuties citrus fruit was flashed on the screen in one frame.
In the very beginning of the vampire movie Blade, an image of a cut throat is flashed in the scene where the protagonists are crossing the cold room that precedes the club room, thus generating apprehension.
In the JJ Villard's Fairy Tales TV show, every episode has four to five images or texts written in bloody words with positive messages, random quotes or devilish artwork at random one frames.

See also
 Programming the Nation?
 Subliminal messages in popular culture
 Subliminal stimuli

References

Advertising